On December 29, 2011 police in Myanmar (also known as Burma)  reported a fire followed by several explosions killing at least 17 people and injuring 83 in Yangon. The dead included five firefighters who were caught in an explosion during the blaze.

The blasts occurred as firefighters were putting out the blaze that had started in a state-owned warehouse before spreading to other buildings and nearby homes before dawn. The earthshaking explosion hit and destroyed over 100 houses, 26 warehouses and two monasteries as well as four fire engines. The explosions rocked the entire city, jolting residents from sleep.

The two owners leased the warehouses from the state for storing electronic goods, chemicals and herbal materials which remained as the highly accessed cause of the violent fire and blast.

References

2011 in Myanmar
2011 explosion
Explosions in Myanmar
December 2011 events in Asia
2011 disasters in Myanmar